Formiga may refer to:
 Formiga, Minas Gerais, a municipality in Minas Gerais state, Brazil
 Morra da Formiga, a favela in Tijuca, Rio de Janeiro, Brazil

People 
 Formiga (footballer, born 1895), Brazilian men's footballer
 Chico Formiga, footballer, born 1930, full name Francisco Ferreira de Aguiar, Brazilian men's football defender
 Formiga (footballer, born 1976), full name Wander dos Santos Machado, Brazilian men's football forward
 Formiga (footballer, born 1978), full name Miraildes Maciel Mota, Brazilian women's football midfielder
 Formiga (futsal player) (born 1978), Portuguese futsal player
 Jussier Formiga (born 1985), Brazilian mixed martial artist

Rivers 
 Formiga River (Tocantins), central Brazil
 Formiga River (Mato Grosso), western Brazil
 Formiga River (Spain), in the Province of Huesca

Other 
 Formiga Esporte Clube, a Brazilian football club
 Santa Catarina, São Tomé and Príncipe, a small village in São Tomé in the Gulf of Guinea